Thomas J. Campbell (born October 27, 1954) is an American chiropractor and politician who served as a member of the Washington House of Representatives, representing the 2nd district from 1993 to 1997 and again from 1999 to 2011. A member of the Democratic Party before 1995 and the Republican Party following 1995, he was defeated by Republican J. T. Wilcox in his 2010 reelection bid.

References

1954 births
Members of the Washington House of Representatives
20th-century American politicians
21st-century American politicians
Living people
Washington (state) Democrats
Washington (state) Republicans
University of Central Florida
Seattle University